Red Gables, also known as the Yard School of Art, is located in Montclair, Essex County, New Jersey, United States. The house was built in 1906 and was added to the National Register of Historic Places on July 1, 1988. Next to it is the synagogue Bnai Keshet.

See also
National Register of Historic Places listings in Essex County, New Jersey

References

Houses on the National Register of Historic Places in New Jersey
Houses completed in 1906
Houses in Essex County, New Jersey
Montclair, New Jersey
National Register of Historic Places in Essex County, New Jersey
New Jersey Register of Historic Places
1906 establishments in New Jersey